Churubusco is a neighbourhood of Mexico City. Under the current territorial division of the Mexican Federal District, it is a part of the borough (delegación) of Coyoacán.

The name "Churubusco" is the interpretation the Spanish conquistadors gave to the original Nahuatl name Huitzilopochco – meaning "place (or temple) of Huitzilopochtli". Earlier attested forms that the adapted name took include Huycholopuzco, Ocholopusco, Ochoroposco, Uchilubusco, and Chulibusco.

History

11th century
The first settlers are believed to have arrived in the area, possibly fleeing the fall of the Toltec Empire.

15th century

Huitzilopochco existed as an independent lordship within Mexico-Tenochtitlan. Its first ruler was Huitzilatzin, a grandson of Huitzilihuitl, the second Tlatoani ("emperor"). Its population numbered some 15,000 dedicated to the cultivation of fruit and flowers and the extraction of salt from the neighboring Lake Texcoco.

A temple (teocalli) dedicated to the worship of Huitzilopochtli stood at a location known as Teopanzolco. Within the Aztec Empire, this teocalli ranked second only to the one at the Templo Mayor in Mexico-Tenochtitlan (some 10 km to the north). Huitzilopochco was famous for the hummingbird feathers (sacred to Huitzilopochtli) that it sent in tribute to the capital.

16th century

In 1503, Ahuitzotl, the eighth Tlatoani, connected a nearby spring to the Mexico-Tenochtitlan water supply. This is believed to have been the direct cause of the great flood of that year that devastated the city and claimed hundreds of lives – including that of Ahuitzotl.

During Hernán Cortés's siege of Mexico-Tenochtitlan in 1521, Huitzilopochco was razed to the ground. 
Some years later, Franciscan friars founded a small convent in the Teopanzolco district, using stones from the destroyed teocalli of Huitzilopochtli. The convent was dedicated to Mary, Queen of Angels. The Franciscans appear to have abandoned it shortly after; the church was transferred to the care of the regular clergy and, in 1580, responsibility for the convent was handed to a second group of Franciscan friars (discalced dieguinos). They rebuilt the monastery and added a novitiate and a school.

17th century

In the second half of this century, thanks to the generosity of one Diego del Castillo and his wife, the monastery was completely rebuilt and much expanded.  Rededicated in 1678, it now consisted of an oratory, dormitories, schoolrooms, a library, a refectory, upper and lower cloisters, a dispensary and an apothecary, and an Andalusian-style courtyard built around a well.

18th century

A series of enhancements were made to the monastery and its church, including a churrigueresque altar dedicated to Our Lady of Guadalupe in 1766 and the installation of an organ in 1791. In 1797 an independent chapel, dedicated to Saint Anthony of Padua, was erected.

19th century
Battle of Churubusco. On 20 August 1847, during the U.S. invasion of Mexico, a bloody and decisive battle was fought in Churubusco – specifically, in the vicinity of the monastery.

In 1857, President Ignacio Comonfort had a monument commemorating the heroic defence of the monastery built in front of its main gates. The remains of Francisco Peñúñuri and Luis Martínez de Castro, two army officers who led their men to perish in a desperate bayonet charge after running out of ammunition during the battle, were interred inside.

In 1869, during the Reform period under President Benito Juárez, the monastery was taken over by the state. It was converted into a military hospital specialising in contagious diseases.

20th century

In 1917, the National University's Inspectorate of Artistic and Historic Monuments managed to convince the authorities that the former monastery would fare better as a museum: as a hospital, it had been more than a little neglected and was in danger of collapse. The museum was opened to the public in 1921.

With the rapid expansion of Mexico City during the mid-20th century, Churubusco ceased to be a separate village and was swallowed up by the urban sprawl of the capital. 
The motion picture production facility of Estudios Churubusco – the nerve centre of the Golden Age of Mexican Cinema – opened in the district in 1945.

Present day

The former monastery of Churubusco now houses the state-run "Interventions Museum" (Museo de las Intervenciones), documenting the different assaults on its territorial integrity that Mexico has suffered since declaring its independence in 1810: 1829 (Spain), 1838 (France), 1846 (United States), 1862 (France), and 1916 (United States). It stands in a residential neighbourhood just outside the southernmost loop of the inner ring-road, in the middle of a pleasant, wooded plaza.

Metro General Anaya (named for Pedro María Anaya) is located in the vicinity. Other nearby street names commemorating the area's history include "Calle Héroes del 47", "Calle 20 de Agosto", and "Calle Mártires Irlandeses".

References

External links
 Templo y ex convento de Churubusco – National Anthropology and History Institute (INAH); Spanish.
 Former Churubusco convent, a place with a long history – The News

Neighborhoods in Mexico City
11th-century establishments in North America
Populated places established in the 11th century